The women's 200 metres sprint event at the 1972 Olympic Games took place on September 4 & 7.  The favorite would have been Republic of China's Chi Cheng, who set world records in the 200 meters and 220 yards distances in 1970. She suffered a career ending injury at the end of 1970. An attempted surgery in 1971, failed. The top 3 ranked women in the world in 1971, were the 3 women on the podium in Munich. European Champion Renate Stecher (GDR), Commonwealth Champion Raelene Boyle (AUS), and the defending Champion Irena Szewinska of Poland.

Heats
Top five in each heat (blue) and the next two fastest (pink) advanced to quarterfinal round.

Heat 1

Heat 2

Heat 3

Heat 4

Heat 5

Heat 6

Quarterfinals
Top four in each heat advanced to semifinal round (blue).

Heat 1

Heat 2

Heat 3

Heat 4

Semifinals
Top four in each heat advanced to the final round (blue).

Heat 1

Heat 2

Final

Key:  WR = world record; DNS = did not start; T = Tie

References

External links
Official report

Women's 200 metres
200 metres at the Olympics
1972 in women's athletics
Women's events at the 1972 Summer Olympics